is a manga series written and illustrated by Masato Hisa. Serialized in Earth Star Entertainment's magazine Comic Earth Star from May 2011 to August 2015, it has been compiled into six tankōbon volumes. An anime television series adaptation by studio Bridge was broadcast from January 5, 2014 to March 30, 2014 in Japan. Crunchyroll and Funimation streamed the episodes with English subtitles.

Plot
To protect the world from the impending invasion of the alien species known only as "Evolutionary Invasion Objects" (EIO), the supranational organization DOGOO created special warriors through DNA manipulation called E-Gene holders. These E-Gene holders are the reincarnations of various historical figures. Using special weapons called AU balls, E-gene holders can call forth AU weapons with an affinity to their assigned historical figure and use it against the invaders. Sio Ogura is one of them, being the reincarnation of Oda Nobunaga. However, her memories of her past life are limited only by dreams about the military past. Going on a school trip in Taiwan, Sio gets caught in the middle of a battle between Evolutionary Invasion Objects and Dogoo's E-gene holders, alongside her classmate Kaoru Asao. When one of the E-Gene holders, the reincarnation of Jack the Ripper, gets incapacitated and Kaoru ends up in danger when confronting an Evolutionary Invasion Object, Sio uses Jack's AU ball to fully activate her E-Gene holder status. She gains her AU weapon, a massive machine gun, and assists the other E-Gene holders to put an end to the Taiwan invasion. After some reluctance, she joins DOGOO at Kaoru's behest.

Defense Organization aGainst Outer Objects (DOGOO)
There are two holder platoons stationed on each of DOGOO’s three floating fortresses: Alex Rogan (Second Platoon’s HQ), Joji Atsumi, and Steven Hiller. The auxiliary battleship Clayton Forrester holds the three together. The fortresses circle around the Pacific Ocean so when reports of an EIO reach them, the nearest fortress will send their platoon to engage the enemies.

Characters

Main characters
The main characters in the series are part of the DOGOO's Second Platoon. They include:

The main protagonist in the series, she is a Japanese student who attends an all-girls school, and the E-Gene Holder of Oda Nobunaga. She is clumsy, but likes military equipment, which her classmates find weird (not shown much in the manga). Even her comrades in DOGOO sees her as a military otaku. One of her only friends in school is Kaoru, whom she saves in the first anime episode and first manga chapter. Following the Kaohsiung incident, she is recruited to DOGOO (chapter 4 in the manga and episode 2 in the anime), where she specializes as a sniper and strategist. Over the course of the series, she develops feelings for Adam.

One of the first DOGOO members that Sio encounters, Adam is the E-Gene Holder of Jack the Ripper, and his AU weapon is a large hunting knife. Though he and Sio team up in various missions, they still get irritated with each other at times. During the Stone Forest Operation, he transforms his weapon into Nightingale Mode, which channels the spirit of Florence Nightingale. He also develops feelings for Sio, even kissing her in episode 13.

 Mahesh likes cute girls and often enjoys teasing Sio. He is the E-Gene Holder of Gandhi, an AU weapon that produces barriers. He doesn’t like his power to create shields as barriers (in the manga) or forcefields (in the anime).

 Jess is the only other female in the Second Platoon. She easily befriends Sio when the latter joins. She is the E-Gene Holder of Newton, an AU weapon that enables her to manipulate gravity with the only drawback being that the target must be under her massive right foot. She French kisses anyone, including Jack and Sio when they went to Second Platoon’s headquarters in anime episode 5.

Defense Organization aGainst Outer Objects (DOGOO)
Some of the characters' real names are unknown, and are thus referred to by their weapons which carry the spirits of various historical figures.

First Platoon

A short-haired woman who is the E-Gene Holder for Geronimo. Her AU weapon is a tomahawk.

A woman who can transform her body into a motorcycle-like machine named , albeit with treads instead of wheels. She dotes on Geronimo, whom she calls Princess.

A young boy who is the E-Gene Holder of Antoni Gaudi. His AU ability allows him to cause large sheets of rock to erupt from any ground he touches, even to enclosing an entire town in a hemispherical dome in episode 11. It seems in episode 6 of the anime that he is a fan of Sio Ogura/Oda Nobunaga. Then he acquires a bikini photo of Sio Ogura that Capa took in episode 3.

Special Squad
Each Special Squad member's AU object is a tool rather than a weapon.

 

 An arrogant young man whose AU tool is a chair that allows him to calculate various things with the speed of a supercomputer. He is named after François Vidocq.

 

 Infused with the spirit of surgeon John Hunter, he examines the bodies of the Evolutionary Invasion Objects using a set of AU surgical and analytical tools. He is dragged into combat during the Stone Forest Operation (anime episode 10 to 13); during which he makes a discovery that leads to the success of the operation.

 A young girl whose AU tool, Galileo, encloses her in a miniature planetarium. She has binocular vision as well as four detachable spherical remote sensor probes named after the Galilean moons of Jupiter. Her probes allow her to see and hear, as well as collect data; however, they must join with her AU tool to transmit the data. Without her AU ball activated, she is actually quite young compared to the rest of the crew. She has a crush on Vidocq.

Upper Echelon

 Leader of Dogoo. She has lived almost two millenniums thanks to DOGOO.

 Not to be confused with the organization DOGOO, he is an alien whose world was destroyed by the Evolutionary Invasion Objects centuries ago, who came to Earth to stop a repeat of the process by collecting the souls of several various distinguished individuals, turning them into "E-Genes" and imputing them into different bloodlines around the world; it would be gene that would be unknowingly passed down from parent to child until its host awoke and became an E-Gene Holder.

 Second-in-Command of DOGOO. He is the Count of St. Germain, who is immortal and has been with the commander since being asked for help by DOGOO. He is not seen much in the manga but a lot in the anime.

Other platoons
 E-Gene Holders in the Third Platoon include Dai Zong from Water Margin, George Hackenschmidt, and Grigori Rasputin.
 E-Gene Holders in the Fourth Platoon include Van Gogh, Mozart, and Cesare Borgia.
 E-Gene Holders in the Sixth Platoon include Nostradamus and Nobel.

Unaffiliated
Some characters are not affiliated with a DOGOO platoon, but are E-Gene Holders:
  is a wheelchair-bound older man who trains new members. He is the E-Gene Holder of Robert Capa, and his AU ability allows him to duplicate any person or object and use its abilities for several minutes. Though he feels Sio is not much cut out to be a sniper, her natural instincts are not something to be overlooked.
 Other E-Gene Holders include Babe Ruth, William Tell, and Christopher Columbus.

Other characters
 

 A popular student in Sio's school and the only one who befriended Sio during their field trip to Kaohsiung. Kaoru wanted to become friends with Sio ever since long ago, which is explained more in the anime. After Sio rescues her when the Evolutionary Invasion Objects attack (chapter 1 in the manga and episode 1 in the anime), Kaoru is inspired to help out and studies to become a nurse (anime episode 9).

Media

Manga
The forty-one manga chapters of Nobunagun are written and illustrated by Masato Hisa. They were serialized for the manga anthology book Comic Earth Star from Earth Star Entertainment, running from May 12, 2011 to August 28, 2015 on the online edition of the magazine. Earth Star Entertainment has been collecting the chapters in tankōbon volumes with the first being published on February 10, 2012. A total of six volumes have been released in Japan as of October 9, 2015.

Anime
The production of an anime adaptation was first announced through the June 2013 issue of Comic Earth Star. It was produced by the animation studio Bridge, directed by Nobuhiro Kondo and scripted by Hiroshi Yamaguchi. On December 25, 2013, a preview of the series was exhibited in the Shinbashi Yakult Hall. Tokyo MX, on January 5, 2014, broadcast the first episode, which was subsequently aired by YTV, CTV, BS11, and AT-X. The thirteenth and last episode was aired on March 30, 2014. VAP released episodes 1–6 in a DVD and Blu-ray box set on April 23, 2014, and episodes 7–13 on July 23, 2014. An English-subtitled version started to be streamed by Crunchyroll on January 5, and by Funimation on their video website on the following day. In March, Madman Entertainment announced at the Wai-Con it have acquired the series' rights. Funimation released the complete series into a DVD and Blu-ray box set on June 2, 2015 in a regular and a limited edition, while Madman Entertainment will release it on July 1, 2015.

The series music is composed by Yutaka Shinya. The opening theme is "Respect for the Dead Man" by Pay Money to My Pain, which is also used as the ending theme for the first episode. Episodes 6 to 10 feature a "ver.β" of "Chīsa na Hoshi" by Shiori Mutō, Chiwa Saitō, Mutsumi Tamura and Ayumu Murase.<ref>Credits from</p></ref> An official soundtrack was released on February 19, 2014; it consists of the full and the television version of "ver．α" and "ver.β" "Chīsa na Hoshi", and 30 other tracks.

Reception
Anime News Network (ANN)'s reviewers have had different opinions on it. About the premise Carl Kimlinger commented "Sound ridiculous? It is. Ridiculously so. But it's also ridiculously fun." Hope Chapman, on the other hand, criticized its story and animation, asserting it "isn't a terrible show," it is "a cheap imitation of other styles and ideas, and without the looks to compensate, its lack of brains isn't very entertaining." Although criticized it for its generic premise, Theron Martin praised its animation and capacity of entertaining. Martin and Rebecca Silverman commended its "striking visuals" and "visual tricks" respectively. Martin, Silverman, Andy Hanley of UK Anime Network and Nicoletta Browne from THEM Anime Reviews praised Sio's characterization, with the latter calling it one of "the show's biggest strengths". Hanley commented that "its opening episode has been one of the most directly exciting and thrilling of the winter season—a rip-roaring action packed affair that continued into an equally enjoyable second episode." He added, "Nobunagun has managed to exceed our expectations, even if those expectations were 'this will probably be terrible'."

Browne praised the action of "these early episodes" as "well-animated and entertaining". However, Browne stated that it "evolves into a missed opportunity almost immediately" due to "the combination of shallowness and technobabble-ridden battle scenes" and "the sexual harassment jokes". Martin The Fandom Post's Thomas Zoth called it "a delight to watch" and stressed, "Fans of shounen anime, yuri undertones, or action series like Hellsing will probably want to check this out." Another critic from The Fandom Post, Kory Cerjak, wrote that the plot is generic "[b]ut Nobunagun is incredibly fun and the visuals of fighting against the EIOs are incredible." Cerjak pointed the anime feels natural, saying "Execution is key in Nobunagun, and it is above average here." Commenting on the last episode, however, Cerjak questioned "Everything returns to the status quo and, while it was fun, I wonder what the point of the entire show was at this point." He declared, "I think its good parts outweigh the bad…that is if you just straight up skip over the bad parts", though. Despite of its "flaws, a great cast of characters, striking visuals, strong musical score and voice acting, and a high-spirited sense of fun help establish the title as a worthy entry in the action genre", according to Martin.

References

External links
  
  
 

Action anime and manga
Anime series based on manga
Bridge (studio)
Earth Star Entertainment manga
Funimation
Shōnen manga
Tokyo MX original programming